Arichuwa (Aymara or Quechua for a kind of potatoes, Hispanicized spelling Arichua) is a mountain in the Andes of southern Peru, about  high. It is situated in the Puno Region, El Collao Province, Santa Rosa District, and in the Chucuito Province, Pisacoma District. Arichuwa lies north of the peaks of Qarwa P'iq'iña.

Arichuwa is also the name of an intermittent stream which originates north of the mountain. It flows to the northwest.

References

Mountains of Puno Region
Mountains of Peru